The coppery sprite (Arielulus cuprosus), also known as the coppery pipistrelle, is a species of vesper bat found only in Malaysia.

References

Arielulus
Mammals described in 1984
Bats of Malaysia
Taxonomy articles created by Polbot

Endemic fauna of Borneo
Endemic fauna of Malaysia